Erika Clarke-Magaña (born 19 August 1981) is a Mexican former professional tennis player.

Biography
A right-handed player from Ciudad Juárez, Clarke represented the Mexico Fed Cup team in ten ties, between 2005 and 2008, with a win–loss record of 5–7.

Clarke was a two-time medalist in doubles at the Central American and Caribbean Games and competed for Mexico at the 2007 Pan American Games, held in Rio de Janeiro.

On the WTA Tour, she featured in the main draw of the doubles at the Mexican Open in Acapulco on four occasions, which included a quarterfinal appearance in 2009.

ITF Circuit finals

Singles: 2 (2 runner-ups)

Doubles: 30 (7 titles, 23 runner-ups)

References

External links
 
 
 

1981 births
Living people
Mexican female tennis players
Sportspeople from Ciudad Juárez
Tennis players at the 2007 Pan American Games
Pan American Games competitors for Mexico
Competitors at the 2002 Central American and Caribbean Games
Competitors at the 2006 Central American and Caribbean Games
Central American and Caribbean Games silver medalists for Mexico
Central American and Caribbean Games bronze medalists for Mexico
Central American and Caribbean Games medalists in tennis
21st-century Mexican women
20th-century Mexican women